Ning Zhongyan (born 3 November 1999) is a Chinese speed skater.

He won a medal at the 2020 World Single Distances Speed Skating Championships.

References

External links

1999 births
Living people
Chinese male speed skaters
People from Mudanjiang
World Single Distances Speed Skating Championships medalists
Speed skaters at the 2022 Winter Olympics
Olympic speed skaters of China
21st-century Chinese people